Oberea rufomaculata is a species of beetle in the family Cerambycidae. It was described by Kono and Tamanuki in 1924.

References

rufomaculata
Beetles described in 1924